This is the list of episodes for the PBS children's program Between the Lions, which aired from April 3, 2000, to November 22, 2010, with a one-year hiatus in 2004.

Series overview

Episodes

Season 1 (2000)

Season 2 (2001)

Season 3 (2002)

Season 4 (2003)

Season 5 (2005)

Season 6 (2006)

Season 7 (2007)

Season 8 (2008)

Season 9 (2009)

Season 10 (2010)

Between the Lions